is a private university in Natori, Miyagi, Japan, established in 2003. The predecessor of the school was founded in 1892.

External links
 Official Website 
 Official Website (English)

References

Educational institutions established in 1892
Private universities and colleges in Japan
Universities and colleges in Miyagi Prefecture
Natori, Miyagi
1892 establishments in Japan
Christian universities and colleges in Japan